The rufous-backed honeyeater (Ptiloprora guisei) is a species of bird in the family Meliphagidae.
It is endemic to Papua New Guinea.

Its natural habitat is subtropical or tropical moist montane forests.

References

Ptiloprora
Birds of Papua New Guinea
Birds described in 1894
Taxonomy articles created by Polbot